|}

The Terry Biddlecombe Challenge Trophy was a Grade 2 National Hunt chase in England which was open to horses aged five years or older. 
It was run at Wincanton over a distance of 2 miles and 5 furlongs (4,224 metres), and was scheduled to take place each year in November.

The race was named in honour of the jockey Terry Biddlecombe and was last run in 2004.  It was won by some of the great names in steeplechasing during the eighties, but the races were often uncompetitive with the winner starting long odds-on.

The race was awarded Grade 2 status in 1990, and the following year was renamed the Desert Orchid South Western Pattern Chase.
In 1994 the race became a Limited Handicap, although it maintained its Grade 2 status.

In its final year it was run as the Desert Orchid Silver Cup, a Class C Handicap, with the Grade 2 status being transferred to the Old Roan Chase at Aintree, run on the same day. There is still a race at Wincanton, now sponsored, where the winning owner receives the Desert Orchid Silver Cup. Run in October it is now run over a distance of just less than 3 miles 3 furlongs.

Winners since 1976

References

Racing Post

Wincanton Racecourse
National Hunt races in Great Britain
National Hunt chases
Discontinued horse races
Recurring sporting events disestablished in 2004